Admiral Sir John Holmes (1640? – 28 May 1683) was an English naval leader who rose to be Commander-in-Chief of the fleet in the English Channel (1677–79) and was the younger brother of the more famous Admiral Sir Robert Holmes.

Military career 

Holmes served in his brother's expedition to West Africa in 1663–1664. At the Battle of Lowestoft in 1665, and until June the following year, he commanded the Paul.

He also fought in the St James's Day Battle, as captain of the 48-gun Bristol. He was then promoted to command of a second-rate, of 64 guns. In 1670-1 he was in Vice Admiral Sir Edward Spragge's expedition against the corsairs of Algiers.

He commanded the Gloucester (62 guns) in the attack on the Dutch Smyrna fleet in 1672, which opened the Third Anglo-Dutch War, capturing one of the Dutch ships though it sank almost immediately because of damage inflicted in the fight. He was wounded, and following this action, knighted, and appointed to command the 66-gun , in which he fought at the Battle of Solebay in 1672, and a number of the battles of the following year.

At the First Battle of Schooneveld he was mentioned in dispatches. In 1673 he was promoted to flag rank, and in 1677–1679 was Commander-in-Chief of the fleet in the English Channel.

Political career 
Holmes's brother, Sir Robert Holmes, had been appointed Governor of the Isle of Wight, and was willing to use the influence this gave him on his brother's behalf. In 1675, Sir John was appointed Governor of Hurst Castle, and from 1677 to 1685 was Member of Parliament for Newtown, Isle of Wight.

Genealogy

 Henry Holmes of Mallow, Cork, Ireland
 Colonel Thomas Holmes of Kilmallock, Limerick, Ireland
 Henry Holmes (–1738) m. Mary Holmes (daughter of Admiral Sir Robert Holmes)
  Thomas Holmes, 1st Baron Holmes (1699–1764)
 Lieutenant General Henry Holmes (1703–62)
 Rear Admiral Charles Holmes (1711–1761)
 Elizabeth Holmes m. Thomas Troughear
 Leonard (Troughear) Holmes, 1st Baron Holmes (–1804) m. Elizabeth Tyrrell (d.1810)
 The Hon. Elizabeth Holmes m. Edward Rushout
 Descendants
 Admiral Sir Robert Holmes (–1692), English Admiral
 Mary Holmes (wife of Henry Holmes)
 Admiral Sir John Holmes (1640?–1683), English Admiral leader

References

 Concise Dictionary of National Biography (1930)
 Robert Latham, The Diary of Samuel Pepys, Volume X: Companion (London: HarperCollins, 1995)
 

 

1683 deaths
Royal Navy admirals
Royal Navy personnel of the Anglo-Dutch Wars
Year of birth uncertain
English MPs 1661–1679
English MPs 1679
English MPs 1680–1681
English MPs 1681
Members of Parliament for the Isle of Wight
1640 births
Governors of Hurst Castle